Ford House is a historic home located at Morgantown, Monongalia County, West Virginia. It was built about 1868, and is a -story, "L" shaped Gothic Revival style cottage.   It features a steeply pitched gable roof, a Gothic arched window in the center gable, and lattice work in lieu of bargeboard on the front porch.

It was listed on the National Register of Historic Places in 1993.

References

Houses on the National Register of Historic Places in West Virginia
Gothic Revival architecture in West Virginia
Houses completed in 1868
Houses in Morgantown, West Virginia
National Register of Historic Places in Monongalia County, West Virginia
1868 establishments in West Virginia